This was the first edition of the tournament.

Carlos Taberner won the title after defeating Nuno Borges 6–2, 6–3 in the final.

Seeds

Draw

Finals

Top half

Bottom half

References

External links
Main draw
Qualifying draw

Challenger di Roseto degli Abruzzi - 1